Michaela Frimmelová (born 17 September 1970) is a Slovak former professional tennis player.

Frimmelová competed on the professional tour from 1987 to 1990, reaching a best singles ranking of 168 in the world. Her best performances on the WTA Tour were second-round appearances at Aix-en-Provence in 1988 and Sofia in 1989. She featured in the women's doubles main draw at the 1990 French Open.

ITF finals

Singles: 1 (0–1)

Doubles: 5 (3–2)

References

External links
 
 

1970 births
Living people
Czechoslovak female tennis players
Slovak female tennis players